Mimopacha is a genus of moths in the family Lasiocampidae. The genus was erected by Per Olof Christopher Aurivillius in 1905.

Species
Some species of this genus are:
Mimopacha audeoudi Romieux, 1935
Mimopacha brunnea Hering, 1941
Mimopacha bryki Aurivillius, 1927
Mimopacha cinerascens (Holland, 1893)
Mimopacha excavata Hering, 1935 
Mimopacha gerstaeckerii (Dewitz, 1881)
Mimopacha jordani Tams, 1936
Mimopacha knoblauchii (Dewitz, 1881)
Mimopacha pelodis Hering, 1928
Mimopacha rotundata Hering, 1941
Mimopacha similis Hering, 1935
Mimopacha tripunctata (Aurivillius, 1905)

References

Lasiocampidae